Phelsuma quadriocellata is a species of gecko known by the common name peacock day gecko. It is endemic to coastal eastern Madagascar, where it is a common to abundant, widespread reptile. This gecko lives in many types of low- to mid-elevation habitat types in Madagascar, including forests and areas with human activity such as cultivated land and human habitation. It is sometimes associated with Pandanus species.

This is likely a species complex. It is currently divided into three subspecies, P. q. quadriocellata, P. q. lepida, and P. q. bimaculata. A fourth subspecies was recently elevated to species status and is now named Phelsuma parva.

Description 
P. quadriocellata measures 4.7-4.8″ (12cm) long, including the tail. Like other arboreal geckos, they have lidless eyes and sticky toe pads. Base color is bright green, with small red markings and a pale underside. The tail may be blue. An identifying characteristic is the large dark spots on each side. Some localities have two such spots, while others have four.

Captivity 
This gecko species is occasionally kept as a pet; collection does not constitute a threat to this species. With good care, peacock day geckos may live up to 15 years in captivity.

References

Phelsuma
Endemic fauna of Madagascar
Reptiles described in 1883